WavePad Audio Editor Software is an audio and music editor for Windows and Mac (also available for iOS and Android). It lets users record and/or edit music, voice and other audio recordings. As an editor, users can cut, copy, paste, delete, insert, silence, and auto-trim recordings, then add effects like amplify, normalize, equalize, envelope, reverb, echo, reverse, and more with the help of VST plugin support and a free stock audio library.

NCH Software claims over 18 million users of the product, and as of March 2016, WavePad was listed as having over 4 million downloads on CNET's Download.com

Features 

The primary functions and tools of WavePad are:
 Sound editing functions: cut, copy, paste, delete, insert, silence, auto-trim and more
 Audio effects: amplify, normalize, equalize, envelope, reverb, echo, reverse and many more with VST plugin compatibility
 Batch processing allows users to apply effects and/or convert thousands of files as a single function
 Scrub, search, and bookmark audio to find, recall and assemble segments of audio files
 Spectral analysis (FFT), speech synthesis (text-to-speech), and voice changer
 Audio restoration tools including noise reduction and click pop removal
 Supports sample rates from 6 to 96 kHz, stereo or mono, 8, 16, 24 or 32 bits
 Remove vocals from music tracks
 Create ready to use ringtones for mobile phones

Controversy 

Previously, WavePad and other NCH products came bundled with optional browser plugins like the Ask and Chrome toolbars, which sparked complaints from users and triggered malware warnings from antivirus software companies like Norton and McAfee. NCH has since unbundled all toolbars in all program versions released after July 2015.

See also
Comparison of digital audio editors
Audacity (audio editor)

References

External links
 Official Site

Audio editors
Multimedia software
C++ software
Proprietary software
Windows multimedia software
MacOS multimedia software